Capira is a district (distrito) of West Panamá Province in Panama. The population according to the 2000 census was 33,110; the latest official estimate (for 2019) is 47,244. The district covers a total area of 978 km². The capital is the city of Capira.

Administrative divisions
Capira District is divided administratively into the following corregimientos:

Capira (capital)
Caimito
Campana
Cermeño
Cirí de Los Sotos
Cirí Grande
El Cacao
La Trinidad
Las Ollas Arriba
Lídice
Villa Carmen
Villa Rosario
Santa Rosa

References

Districts of Panamá Oeste Province